Paleka (born 4 October 1954, in Lisbon) is a Portuguese percussionist in the genres of jazz, contemporary music, and world music.

Career
He is one of the four musicians in O Quarteto, the first ensemble to have emerged from Portugal's first school of jazz. The school, now known as Escola de Jazz Luís Villas-Boas, was opened in the late 1970s and led by bass player Zé Eduardo.

Paleka has performed and recorded with the country's most respected pop, rock, and jazz musicians, including Sérgio Godinho, Jorge Palma, Mário Laginha, António Pinho Vargas, and Rui Veloso.

Some of Paleka's first televised appearances were for the state television station RTP1 on Luis Vilas-Boas's program "Club de Jazz" as part of the house band alongside Mário Laginha and Carlos Barretto.

In 1979, he performed in the Quinteto Pedro Mestre at the 9th Cascais Jazz Festival, this was his first appearance in international jazz fests.

He has also shared the stage repeatedly with many others such as Steve Potts, Zé Eduardo, Carlos Azevedo.

He has been involved in multi-media projects alongside Miguel Valle de Figueiredo (photographer), and Guida Almeida (visual artist) among others.

His influences include Peter Erskine, Steve Gadd, and Tony Williams among others.

Discography
Recordings featuring Paleka include:
Guardador de Margens (Rui Veloso)
Acto Continuo (Jorge Palma)
Bit (Bit)
Tinta Permanente (Sérgio Godinho)
Aos Amores (Sérgio Godinho)
Noites passadas (Sérgio Godinho)
Rivolitz (Sérgio Godinho) – also recorded as video / DVD
Mar Português (Companhia Bengala)
Crepúsculo do Vinho (Kinteto António Ferro)
Viragens (Quinteto de Jazz de Lisboa)
Coisas do Fado (Quinteto de Jazz de Lisboa)

Festivals
He has performed at festivals such as:
 Seville International Jazz Festival (Spain) — with the Mike Ross Quartet
 500th anniversary of the Founding of Brazil (Rio de Janeiro/São Paulo, Brazil) — with Sérgio Godinho and Milton Nascimento
 Oporto European Jazz Festival (Portugal) — 3 por 4 with John Schröder
 Seville International Jazz Festival (Spain) — with Kai Winding
 Macau International Jazz Festival (Macau) — António Ferro Quintet
 Festival de Canto-Autor (Sanremo, Italy) — with Sérgio Godinho
 World Music Festival (Rotterdam, Netherlands) — with Sérgio Godinho
 World Music Festival (Bonn, Germany) — Músicas de Sol e de Lua (Godinho, Vitorino, Felipa Pais, Janita e Rão Kyao)
 Maré de Agosto Festival on the Santa Maria Island, Azores (Portugal) — with Lindumona
 Eurovision Counter-Festival (Brussels, Belgium) — Sérgio Godinho
 Algarve International Jazz Festival (Faro, Portugal) – O Quarteto
 9th Cascais International Jazz Festival (Portugal) — Pedro Mestre Quintet
 Sete Sois Sete Luas International Festival (Pisa, Italy) — with Sérgio Godinho
 14th Cascais International Jazz Festival (Portugal) — with Rui Veloso
 Algarve Jazz (Faro, Portugal) — Kinteto António Ferro
 Guimarães Jazz (Portugal) — Ana Alves Quintet
 Guimarães Jazz (Portugal) — Kinteto António Ferro
 Festival Maré de Agosto (Santa Maria) — with Sérgio Godinho
 Maré de Agosto Festival (Santa Maria) — with Sérgio Godinho

External links
All that Jazz 
Paleka's blog 

1954 births
Living people
Jazz drummers
Portuguese jazz musicians